Bingo-Master's Break-Out! is the debut EP by English post-punk band The Fall. It was released on 11 August 1978 through record label Step-Forward.

The EP failed to chart in either the UK Singles Chart or the UK Indie Singles Chart.

Background 

Bingo-Master's Break-Out is the only studio recording by the original Fall line-up (Mark E. Smith, Martin Bramah, Tony Friel and Una Baines, plus Karl Burns who replaced the short-lived original drummer Steve Ormrod). The recording was financed by the Buzzcocks manager Richard Boon, who planned to release it on his New Hormones label; unable to afford it, he gave the tapes back to the band. The EP remained unreleased for almost a year, finally coming out in August 1978. By that time, both Friel and Baines had already quit the band, as did Friel's brief replacement Jonnie Brown who designed the cover art.

A fourth track, titled "Frightened", was set to appear on this EP, but it was not deemed up to scratch by frontman Mark E. Smith. A different recording later surfaced on the band's debut album, Live at the Witch Trials, and the original is now believed lost.

Critical reception
The Encyclopedia of Popular Music called the EP "a good example of Smith's surreal vision, coloured by his relentlessly northern working-class vigil."

Track listing

Personnel 
 The Fall

 Mark E. Smith – vocals, production
 Martin Bramah – guitar, backing vocals, production
 Tony Friel – bass guitar, backing vocals, production
 Karl Burns – drums, production
 Una Baines – keyboards, production

 Technical

 Jonnie Brown – cover artwork
 Phil Hampson - engineer

References

External links 

 

1978 debut EPs
Post-punk EPs